Jagraj Singh Hundal (3 June 1979 – 20 July 2017), known as Bhai Jagraj Singh, was a British Army officer and Sikh preacher. 

He was the founder of Sikh organisations, Everything's 13, and the Sikh Press Association and YouTube channel Basics of Sikhi.

Early life and education 
Jagraj was born on June 3, 1979 and grew up and attended secondary school in Hounslow, London. He studied Philosophy, Politics and Economics at the University of Oxford.  

His elder brother was journalist Sunny Hundal.

Career 

After graduating from the Royal Military Academy Sandhurst Singh was commissioned into the Royal Logistic Corps before finding a job in the finance sector. 

In 2012, he founded Everything's 13, a project to spread awareness of the Sikh faith both digitally and through the English language. His most notable work was YouTube channel, Basics of Sikhi. In 2014, Singh founded the Sikh Press Association (SikhPA).

In February 2017, Singh was awarded a Point of Light Award by UK Prime Minister Theresa May. In the award letter, May wrote: "Your important work is doing much to positively engage both young Sikhs and the wider community with your faith. You are inspiring those of all faiths and none to make a difference with their lives".

Family life and death 
In December 2016, he was diagnosed with stage 4 inoperable liver cancer and died on July 20, 2017. Singh was considered as one of the most influential British Sikhs of the 21st century.

He was survived by his wife and three children.

References

External links 

 Everything's 13 - official website
 Basics of Sikhi - official website
 Sikh Press Association - official website

Graduates of the Royal Military Academy Sandhurst
Royal Logistic Corps officers
People from Hounslow
English Sikhs
1979 births
2017 deaths
Alumni of the University of Oxford
Deaths from liver cancer
Organization founders